Thomas Chirnside (1815 – 1887) was an Australian pastoralist who settled on much of what would become western Melbourne.

Thomas Chirnside was born in Berwickshire, Scotland, the elder son of Robert Chirnside and Mary Fairs. His father was also a farmer.

In 1839 Chirnside came from Liverpool on the ship . He arrived in Adelaide in January, and Sydney in March of that year. The drought of 1839 adversely affected the sheep he had bought near the Murrumbidgee River, so he joined his younger brother Andrew in Melbourne.

In April 1842 the brothers established a station in the Grampians, and that same year Thomas acquired a station on the Wannon River, where he was one of the first to employ Aboriginal People. In the mid-1840s the brothers acquired series of properties in the Western District of Victoria.

The elder Chirnside settled in Werribee, Victoria, just before the gold rushes, eventually buying 80,000 acres (320 km²) of land. He built a substantial bluestone house surrounded by a ha ha wall, and later, in the 1870s, the sandstone Italianate Werribee Park Mansion.

On 2 September 1853 he purchased through a government grant Section 14, Parish of Cut Paw Paw, County of Burke.

Thomas Chirnside was a member of the Philosophical Institute of Victoria from 1857 to 1859 and the Royal Society of Victoria from 1860 to 1866. He was a strict Sabbatarian, allowing no work on his properties on Sundays. He donated an acre (0.4 ha) of land and £100 for the first Presbyterian Church in Werribee, and in February 1884, he laid the foundation stone of the second one. He and Andrew gave £1000 to Ormond College, at the University of Melbourne.

Suffering from depression, Thomas Chirnside committed suicide with a shotgun in 1887. His body was found in the laundry of Werribee Mansion. Andrew Chirnside inherited the property, but died three years later.

A primary school in Werribee has been named in his honour.

References

Further reading

Wool Past the Winning Post by Heather B Ronald A History of the Chirnside Family published by Landvale Enterprises 1978

External links
 1874 portrait of Thomas Chirnside by Alexander S. Mackay in the collection of the State Library of Victoria.

1815 births
1887 deaths
Australian farmers
Suicides by firearm in Victoria (Australia)